Enrico Eugenio "Rick" Ferraro (born January 7, 1950) is a former politician in Ontario, Canada. He was a Liberal member of the Legislative Assembly of Ontario from 1985 to 1990.

Background
Ferraro was educated at the University of Guelph, and was a founder of Kids Can Play - Guelph. Ferraro is an active member of the Guelph community. He is a partner in Steele Ferraro Insurance Brokerage, he also owns the Grange and Victoria Plaza.

Politics
He was elected to the Ontario legislature in the 1985 provincial election, defeating Progressive Conservative Marilyn Robinson by 5,006 votes in the constituency of Wellington South.  He was re-elected by more than 9,000 votes over NDP candidate Derek Fletcher in the 1987 election, in the redistributed riding of Guelph.

Ferraro was a backbench supporter of David Peterson's government, and held several parliamentary assistant positions. In 1986, he was appointed as Ontario's first Small Business Advocate.

The Liberals were defeated by the NDP in the 1990 provincial election, and Ferraro lost his seat to Fletcher by 3,097 votes.  He attempted a comeback in the 1995 election, but lost to Brenda Elliott of the Progressive Conservatives by just over 5,700 votes.

References

External links

1950 births
Living people
Businesspeople from Ontario
Ontario Liberal Party MPPs
People from Guelph
University of Guelph alumni